The 2009 British Columbia Scotties Tournament of Hearts, British Columbia's women's provincial curling championship, was held January 20-25 at the Parksville Curling Club in Parksville, British Columbia. The winner represents team British Columbia at the 2009 Scotties Tournament of Hearts in Victoria, British Columbia.

Teams

Standings

Results

January 21
Wheatcroft 8-3 Palmer
Maskiewich 6-3 Garvey
Jones 5-3 Mallett
MacInnes 5-4 Recksiedler 
Recksiedler 7-2 Garvey
Mallett 10-3 Palmer
MacInnes 4-3 Maskiewich
Wheatcroft 8-5 Jones

January 22
MacInnes 7-5 Palmer
Maskiewich 8-6 Jones 
Recksiedler 5-4 Wheatcroft
Mallett 8-2 Garvey
Maskiewich 5-3 Mallett
MacInnes 11-3 Wheatcroft 
Garvey 10-3 Jones  
Recksiedler 7-2 Palmer

January 23
Wheatcroft 7-5 Garvey
Recksiedler 12-5 Jones
Maskiewich 9-7 Palmer  
MacInnes 5-4 Mallett
MacInnes 9-5 Jones  
Garvey 5-3 Palmer
Mallett 10-6 Recksiedler 
Wheatcroft 5-4 Maskiewich

January 24
Maskiewich 9-6 Recksiedler
Mallett 5-4 Wheatcroft
MacInnes 6-5 Garvey
Jones 11-6 Palmer

Tie breakers
Reckseidler 6-4 Wheatcroft
Mallett 8-6 Recksiedler

Playoffs
All games January 25

Semi-final

Final

External links
Official site

British Columbia
Curling in British Columbia
Parksville, British Columbia
2009 in British Columbia